Early Science and Medicine is a peer-reviewed academic journal of the history of science and medicine.

The editor-in-chief is Christoph Lüthy of Radboud University, Nijmegen. The journal is published by Brill and indexed in Arts and Humanities Citation Index, Academic Search Complete, PubMed, and Scopus.

References

External links 
 

Brill Publishers academic journals
Publications established in 1996
English-language journals
History of science journals
History of medicine journals